600 BC: One of the 16 great janapadas, named Ashmaka
 230 BC to 225 AD: ruled by the Satavahanas
 250 to 525: The Vakatakas brought the Vidharba under their rule.
 550 to 760: Ruled by the Chalukyas (Badami Chalukyas)
 640: Chinese pilgrim Xuanzang visited Maharashtra
 973: Rashtrakutas rule comes to an end
 973 to 1180: Ruled by the Chalukyas (Western Chalukyas or Kalyani Chalukyas)
 1189 to 1310: Ruled by the Yadavas of Deogiri (Seunas)
 1296: Alla-ud-din Khilji, the first Muslim sultan of the north, penetrated the Deccan, defeated the Yadavas, and carried away a huge hoard of loot.
 1534: Portuguese occupied Mumbai.
 1659: Chatrapati Shivaji Maharaj captured Satara from Bijapur Sultanate, and led a revolt against the Mughal Empire
 1661: Mumbai transferred from Portugal to Britain
 1668: British government transferred Mumbai to the British East India Company
 1674: Chatrapati Shivaji Maharaj became the first King of the Marathas
 1680: Death of Chatrapati Shivaji Maharaj 
 1689: Death of Chatrapati Sambhaji Maharaj
1707: Chatrapati Shahu Maharaj I became Chhatrapati of the Maratha Empire
1720: Bajirao I became peshwa (prime minister)
 1740: Death of Bajirao I
 1756: Marathas captured the town of Attock (now in north-west Pakistan). Maratha Empire reached its largest extent.
 14 January 1761: Marathas lost the Third Battle of Panipat.
 1775–1782: First Anglo-Maratha War
 1803–1805: Second Anglo-Maratha War
 1817–1818: Third Anglo-Maratha War
 3 June 1818: Bajirao II surrendered to the British
 15 August 1947: Independence of India
 1 November 1956: Bombay state enlarged to include all of present Maharashtra.
 1 May 1960: Bombay state split along linguistic lines into new states of Gujarat and Maharashtra.

 
Maharashtra